Robert Michael "Zeke" Zawoluk (October 13, 1930 – January 9, 2007) was an American professional basketball player.

A 6'7" forward/center from Saint Francis Prep and St. John's University, Zawoluk played three seasons (1952–1955) in the NBA as a member of the Indianapolis Olympians and Philadelphia Warriors.

See also
 List of NCAA Division I men's basketball players with 60 or more points in a game

References

1930 births
2007 deaths
All-American college men's basketball players
Basketball players from New York City
Centers (basketball)
Indianapolis Olympians draft picks
Indianapolis Olympians players
Philadelphia Warriors players
Power forwards (basketball)
Sportspeople from Brooklyn
St. John's Red Storm men's basketball players
American men's basketball players